List of archaeological excavations in Jerusalem is an incomplete list of archaeological excavations in Jerusalem.

In 1952 Father Jan Jozef Simons published Jerusalem in the Old Testament: Researches and Theories, which was a complete list of all archaeological excavations in Jerusalem up until the Second World War; the book become the "Jerusalem Bible" for archaeologists.

Small scale excavations continued between 1948 and 1967, but the modern excavation of the city accelerated only after Israel's capture of East Jerusalem in 1967.

19th Century 
The nineteenth century saw much interest in Jerusalem develop. British Protestants, eager to find hard evidence for their Christian convictions, set out to dig the Holy City. Among them were Flinders Petrie, Charles Warren, Charles William Wilson and Montague Parker.

The British Mandate 
During the Mandate, efforts to excavate Jerusalem continued with digs by R. A. Stewart Macalister in the City of David.

Jordanian Rule 
Under Jordanian rule, Kathleen Kenyon excavated in the City of David, discovering numerous important finds including the proto-Ionic capital.

Summary Table

Bibliography
 Margreet Steiner, 2016, From Jerusalem with Love, History, Archaeology and The Bible Forty Years After “Historicity”. Changing Perspectives 6, edited by Ingrid Hjelm and Thomas L. Thompson, Routledge, pp. 71–84
 Margreet Steiner, 2014, One Hundred and Fifty Years of Excavating Jerusalem Bart Wagemakers (ed.), Archaeology in the Land of `Tells and Ruins’. A History of Excavations in the Holy Land Inspired by the Photographs and Accounts of Leo Boer. Oxbow Books, Oxford.

References

Excavations in Jerusalem
Israel history-related lists
 
Lists of buildings and structures in Israel
Archaeological excavations